Todd Eric Benzinger (born February 11, 1963) is an American former professional baseball first baseman and outfielder who played a nine-year Major League Baseball (MLB) career from 1987 to 1995.

Biography
Benzinger was born in Dayton, Kentucky, and is a graduate of New Richmond High School in New Richmond, Ohio. Benzinger started his MLB career with the Boston Red Sox in 1987. He would later play for other teams such as the Cincinnati Reds, Kansas City Royals, Los Angeles Dodgers, and the San Francisco Giants. Benzinger ended his professional playing career in 1995 after playing with the Columbus Clippers, then a minor league affiliate of the New York Yankees. He played the majority of his career at the first baseman position, although he did occasionally play the outfield.

As a member of the Red Sox, Benzinger is legendary for his clutch hitting during the Sox' 1988 "Morgan Magic" run, particularly his 10th inning walk-off HR on July 20, 1988. This has been called "The Benzinger Game" by some Red Sox enthusiasts. Benzinger ended Orel Hershiser's scoreless streak at 59 innings on an RBI hit in the first inning of Hershiser's first start of 1989. Benzinger joined the Cincinnati Reds in 1989 and led the National League in at bats with 628. Benzinger was a member of the  World Series winning Reds which saw Cincinnati sweep the much favored Oakland A's in four games. Benzinger caught the last out in the 9th inning of Game 4 to give the Reds a victory.

From 2006 to 2008, Benzinger coached the girls' basketball team at Loveland High School in Loveland, Ohio. He managed the Dayton Dragons for the 2009 and 2010 seasons.

References

External links

Stats at MLB.com

1963 births
Living people
Boston Red Sox players
Cincinnati Reds players
Kansas City Royals players
Los Angeles Dodgers players
San Francisco Giants players
Major League Baseball first basemen
Baseball players from Kentucky
People from Dayton, Kentucky
Elmira Pioneers players
Winston-Salem Red Sox players
Winter Haven Red Sox players
New Britain Red Sox players
Pawtucket Red Sox players
Columbus Clippers players
People from Loveland, Ohio
Minor league baseball managers
Sportspeople from the Cincinnati metropolitan area